Frank Allen (5 May 1901 – 30 October 1989) was an English professional footballer who played as an inside forward and later as a wing half. Originally a coal miner by trade, he became a full-time footballer at the age of 24 and went on to play professionally for the next 11 years. He played for six different teams in the Football League, making over 230 league appearances in total.

Early and personal life
Allen was born on 5 May 1901 in Altofts, West Yorkshire and was brought up in a mining background, which was typical of the area at the time. He started working Altofts Colliery in 1919 and played part-time football for the colliery. After his retirement from football, he returned to the mines, working at Ollerton Colliery from 1937. He regularly played golf and was a keen gardener, entering several flower shows and gardening competitions. In his later years, he lived in Ravenshead in Nottinghamshire. Allen died from pneumonia on 30 October 1989 at the age of 88.

Career
Allen left Altofts in 1925 to join amateur side Castleford Town, who played in the Midland Football League. Castleford finished bottom of the division in the 1925–26 campaign, but Allen's performances had attracted professional clubs to secure his signature, and he joined Football League Second Division side Barnsley in February 1926 at the age of 24. He was moved from right-half to inside forward to accommodate Dai Jones. He scored two goals in his first 10 matches with Barnsley, but despite playing as an inside forward he failed to get on the scoresheet in the next two seasons and was released by the club at the end of the 1927–28 season having scored two goals in 68 league matches.

Upon his release by Barnsley, Allen joined Bangor City in August 1928, but remained at the club for only six months before transferring to Second Division outfits Port Vale and then Clapton Orient. He failed to make a single first-team appearance for either club and Orient were relegated in 1928–29; he left Orient to sign for Football League Third Division North side Southport in June 1929. He spent one season at Southport, scoring six goals in 31 league games.

In August 1930, Allen moved to fellow Third Division North club Nelson on a free transfer. He made his debut for the team on 30 August 1930 in the 5–4 away defeat to Rochdale. He played 17 first-team games for Nelson and scored once, in an FA Cup tie. Nelson struggled in the league in the 1930–31 season, eventually failing re-election at the end of the campaign, and Allen departed the club to join Barrow in January 1931 where manager Jimmy Commins signed him for the third time in his career. He was converted into a wing half during his time at Holker Street and his goalscoring rate was significantly increased as he scored seven goals in his first 18 league matches. Allen left Barrow in August 1933, having played 67 matches and scored 11 goals for the club. Prior to the start of the 1933–34 season, Allen signed for New Brighton where he played for two seasons, netting 18 times in 51 games, the most prolific period of his career. This tally included a hat-trick against former club Southport on 7 April 1934. In 1935, Allen joined Ligue 2 side Le Havre and subsequently had a two-year spell in France, before retiring from professional football in 1937.

Career statistics
Source:

References

1901 births
1989 deaths
People from Altofts
People from Gedling (district)
Footballers from Nottinghamshire
Footballers from Yorkshire
English footballers
English expatriate footballers
Association football inside forwards
Association football wing halves
Castleford Town F.C. players
Barnsley F.C. players
Bangor City F.C. players
Port Vale F.C. players
Leyton Orient F.C. players
Southport F.C. players
Nelson F.C. players
Barrow A.F.C. players
New Brighton A.F.C. players
Le Havre AC players
English Football League players
Ligue 2 players
Expatriate footballers in France
Deaths from pneumonia in England